Pedro del Vecchio (born 16 October 1912, date of death unknown) was a Colombian athlete. He competed in the men's triple jump at the 1936 Summer Olympics.

References

1912 births
Year of death missing
Athletes (track and field) at the 1936 Summer Olympics
Colombian male triple jumpers
Olympic athletes of Colombia
Place of birth missing
20th-century Colombian people